The Kane Mountain Fire Observation Station is a historic fire observation station located on Kane Mountain at Caroga in Fulton County, New York. The tower and trail are contributing resources. The tower is a prefabricated structure built by the Aermotor Corporation and provided a front line of defense in preserving the Adirondack Forest Preserve from the hazards of forest fires.

It was added to the National Register of Historic Places in 2001.

The Kane Mountain Fire Observation Station can be accessed via three separate foot trails leading to the summit of Kane Mountain. The main trail runs from Green Lake Rd. This 0.5 mile hike climbs 600 ft. to the top of the mountain at 2200 ft. above sea level. The trail is moderate in difficulty. The second trail runs from Schoolhouse Road. This is a shorter ascent to the top, however its difficulty is higher due to a steeper grade and rocks. A third trail can be accessed either from the Green Lake Rd. trailhead or from the Pine Lake Campground.

References

External links

The Fire Towers of New York

Government buildings on the National Register of Historic Places in New York (state)
Infrastructure completed in 1925
Towers completed in 1925
Buildings and structures in Fulton County, New York
Fire lookout towers in Adirondack Park
Fire lookout towers on the National Register of Historic Places in New York (state)
National Register of Historic Places in Fulton County, New York